Salif Cissé may refer to:

 Salif Cissé (footballer, born 1992), French football forward
 Salif Cissé (footballer, born 1994), German football midfielder